Kodihalli is a locality in the eastern part of Bangalore. It starts from 80 feet Indiranagar, Jeevanbhima Nagar junction and extends up to Leela Palace on Old Airport Road. Until the late 90s, Kodihalli was just a nondescript village on the way to HAL Airport, but since4 then it has seen extraordinary real estate growth of this area owing to its proximity to offices on Old Airport Road. It is surrounded by well established areas like Thippasandra, Indiranagar and Domlur. It is about 4 km from M.G road. Nearest Railway Station is at Krishnarajapuram about 7 km.

References

External links

Location of Kodihalli in Bangalore

Neighbourhoods in Bangalore